Hiram Bell may refer to:

 Hiram Bell (1808–1855), U.S. Representative from Ohio's Third Congressional District
 Hiram Parks Bell (1827–1907), U.S. Representative and Confederate Representative from the state of Georgia

See also
 Hiram Bell Farmstead, a historic house in Fairfield Township, Ohio